In mathematics, Plancherel measure is a measure defined on the set of irreducible unitary representations of a locally compact group , that describes how the regular representation breaks up into irreducible unitary representations. In some cases the term Plancherel measure is applied specifically in the context of the group  being the finite symmetric group  – see below. It is named after the Swiss mathematician Michel Plancherel for his work in representation theory.

Definition for finite groups

The corresponding Plancherel measure over the set  is defined by

where , and  denotes the dimension of the irreducible representation .

Definition on the symmetric group

An important special case is the case of the finite symmetric group , where  is a positive integer.

 

The fact that those probabilities sum up to 1 follows from the combinatorial identity 

which corresponds to the bijective nature of the Robinson–Schensted correspondence.

Application

Plancherel measure appears naturally in combinatorial and probabilistic problems, especially in the study of longest increasing subsequence of a random permutation . As a result of its importance in that area, in many current research papers the term Plancherel measure almost exclusively refers to the case of the symmetric group .

Connection to longest increasing subsequence 

Let  denote the length of a longest increasing subsequence of a random permutation  in  chosen according to the uniform distribution. Then the following identity holds:

Poissonized Plancherel measure 

For any , the Poissonized Plancherel measure with parameter  on the set  is defined by

for all .

Plancherel growth process 

The Plancherel growth process is a random sequence of Young diagrams  such that each  is a random Young diagram of order  whose probability distribution is the nth Plancherel measure, and each successive  is obtained from its predecessor  by the addition of a single box, according to the transition probability

 

So, the Plancherel growth process can be viewed as a natural coupling of the different Plancherel measures of all the symmetric groups, or alternatively as a random walk on Young's lattice.

Compact groups

The Plancherel measure for compact groups is similar to that for finite groups, except that the measure need not be finite. The unitary dual is a discrete set of finite-dimensional representations, and the Plancherel measure of an irreducible finite-dimensional representation is proportional to its dimension.

Abelian groups

The unitary dual of a locally compact abelian group is another locally compact abelian group, and the Plancherel measure is proportional to the Haar measure of the dual group.

Semisimple Lie groups

The Plancherel measure for semisimple Lie groups was found by Harish-Chandra. The support is the set of tempered representations, and in particular not all unitary representations need occur in the support.

References

Representation theory